Narela railway station is a railway station on Ambala–Delhi rail route in Narela which is a residential and commercial neighborhood of the North West Delhi district of Delhi. Its code is NUR. The station is part of Northern Railways' Ambala–Delhi rail route. The station consist of two platforms. The platform is  well sheltered and includes water and public convenience facilities.  The station has a book stall and a small refreshment stall. The station was established in 1890.

Trains 

The following trains run from Narela railway station:

 Lokmanya Tilak Terminus–Amritsar Express
 Sahibabad ←→ Sonipat MEMU
 Delhi–Fazilka InterCity Express
 Delhi–Kalka Passenger (unreserved)
 Delhi ←→ Panipat MEMU
 Ghaziabad ←→ Panipat MEMU
 Himachal Express
 Jammu Mail
 Jhelum Express
 New Delhi ←→ Kurukshetra MEMU
 Panipat ←→ Delhi MEMU
 Kurukshetra ←→ Hazrat Nizamuddin MEMU
 Unchahar Express

See also

 Hazrat Nizamuddin railway station
 New Delhi railway station
 Delhi Junction railway station
 Anand Vihar Terminal railway station
 Delhi Sarai Rohilla railway station
 Delhi Metro

References 

Railway stations in North West Delhi district
Delhi railway division